Hylotelephium erythrostictum, commonly known as garden stonecrop, is a herbaceous perennial plant in the genus Hylotelephium, belonging to the family Crassulaceae.

Description
The flowering period extends from September through October in the Northern Hemisphere.

Distribution
It is native to Japan, Korea, Russia and China.

Habitat
This plant grows in grasslands, meadows, hillsides, and ravines.

References

 Biolib
 Flora of China
 Plants.USDA
 ZipcodeZoo

External links
 RHS Plant Selector
 Sedum erythrostictum 'Frosty Morn'
 IPNI Listing
 Kew Plant List

Crassulaceae